Nordstar Tower is a skyscraper office building in Moscow, Russia.  Construction was begun in 2006 and completed in 2009.  There are 42 floors (40 above ground), 30 elevators, and the gross floorspace is 147,000 square metres.  Roof height is 171.5 metres.

Structure
Reference
 Structural material, concrete
 Facade material, aluminum
 Facade system, curtain wall

References

Office buildings completed in 2009
Skyscraper office buildings in Moscow